Dholipal is a small village in the district of Hanumangarh district of Rajasthan, India.

Villages in Hanumangarh district